Qendër Bulgarec is a former municipality in the Korçë County, southeastern Albania. At the 2015 local government reform it became a subdivision of the municipality Korçë. The population at the 2011 census was 9,022. The municipal unit consists of the villages Bulgarec, Lumalas, Biranj, Melçan, Porodinë, Dishnicë, Shamoll, Belorta, Kuç i Zi, Barç, Çiflig, Malavec and Neviçisht.

Notable people
Georgios Soulios, Greek guerilla fighter.

References

Former municipalities in Korçë County
Administrative units of Korçë